|}

The Debutante Stakes is a Group 2 flat horse race in Ireland open to two-year-old thoroughbred fillies. It is run at the Curragh over a distance of 7 furlongs (1,408 metres), and it is scheduled to take place each year in August.

History
The event was formerly held at Phoenix Park, and it used to be contested over 6 furlongs. For a period it was classed at Group 3 level. It was transferred to the Curragh and relegated to Listed status in 1991. It was moved to Leopardstown and extended to 7 furlongs in 1994.

The Debutante Stakes returned to the Curragh in 2000, and it regained Group 3 status in 2001. It was promoted to Group 2 level in 2004, and it continued at the Curragh until 2005.

In recent years, the venue of the race has switched between Leopardstown (2006, 2008–09) and the Curragh (2007, 2010–19).

Records
Leading jockey since 1986 (4 wins):
 Michael Kinane – Polar Bird (1989), Low Key Affair (1993), Dance Design (1995), Necklace (2003)

Leading trainer since 1986 (13 wins):
 Aidan O'Brien – Glounthaune Garden (1994), Family Tradition (1996), Photogenic (1997), Necklace (2003), Silk and Scarlet (2004), Rumplestiltskin (2005), Lillie Langtry (2009), Maybe (2011), Tapestry (2013), Ballydoyle (2015), Rhododendron (2016), Magical (2017), Mediatate (2022)

Winners since 1986

See also
 Horse racing in Ireland
 List of Irish flat horse races

References
 Racing Post:

 galopp-sieger.de – Debutante Stakes.
 ifhaonline.org – International Federation of Horseracing Authorities – Debutante Stakes (2019).
 pedigreequery.com – Debutante Stakes.

Flat races in Ireland
Curragh Racecourse
Flat horse races for two-year-old fillies